7068 aluminium alloy is one of the strongest commercially available aluminium alloys, with a tensile strength comparable to that of some steels. This material, also known as an aircraft alloy, is heat treatable. 

Typical yield strength for alloy 7068-T6511 is  versus  for a similar product produced from 7075-T6511. Strength allowables for this alloy are provided in Metallic Materials Properties Development and Standardization for design.

The main alloying elements are zinc (7.3 to 8.3%), magnesium (2.2 to 3.0%), copper (1.6 to 2.4%) and zirconium (0.05 to 0.15%), with traces of silicon, iron, manganese, chromium, and titanium.

Chemical composition

Physical properties

Mechanical properties

Thermal Properties

Technical description 
7068 alloy is a 7000 series aluminium-zinc alloy registered with the US Aluminium Association and produced to AMS 4331 (chemical composition and mechanical properties) and AMS 2772 (heat treatment). 7068 alloy ‘A’ and ‘B’ tensile data and fatigue properties have been ratified for inclusion in MIL Handbook 5 / MMPDS.

Uses 
Primarily developed for ordnance applications, alloy 7068 is now being used or considered for markets like the aerospace and automotive industries (valve body and connecting rod applications), medical devices, such as prosthetic limbs, as well as recreational products like bicycles and mountain-climbing equipment.

Application 
 Connecting rods
 Shock absorbers
 Fuel pumps
 Rocker arms
 Bearing caps
 Prosthetics
 Chain tensioners

Standard specifications 
Standard specifications for AL 7068 include:
 AMS 4331
AMS 2772

References

External links 
 Article title
 Aluminum  7068-T6; 7068-T6511 Rod & Bar, http://www.matweb.com/search/datasheet_print.aspx?matguid=1ee9c9628f9d455b97fb4606daa84bd9
 https://www.emerald.com/insight/content/doi/10.1108/aeat.2002.12774aad.022/full/html

Aluminium–zinc alloys